The 2021–22 Ole Miss Rebels women's basketball team represented the University of Mississippi during the 2021–22 NCAA Division I women's basketball season. The Rebels, led by fourth-year head coach Yolett McPhee-McCuin, played their home games at The Sandy and John Black Pavilion at Ole Miss and competed as members of the Southeastern Conference (SEC).

Previous season
The Rebels finished the season 15–12 (4–10 SEC) and received an at-large bid to the Women's National Invitation Tournament, where they lost to Rice in the championship game.

Offseason

Departures

2021 recruiting class

Incoming transfers

Roster

Schedule

|-
!colspan=9 style=| Non-conference regular season

|-
!colspan=9 style=| SEC regular season

|-
!colspan=9 style=| SEC Tournament

|-
!colspan=9 style=| NCAA tournament

See also
2021–22 Ole Miss Rebels men's basketball team

References

Ole Miss Rebels women's basketball seasons
Ole Miss
Ole Miss Rebels
Ole Miss Rebels
Ole Miss